"Road to Nowhere" is a rock song written by David Byrne for the 1985 Talking Heads album Little Creatures. It also appeared on Best of Talking Heads, Sand in the Vaseline: Popular Favorites, the Once in a Lifetime box set and the Brick box set. It also made  on the Dutch Top 40.

Production
"I wanted to write a song that presented a resigned, even joyful look at doom," recalls David Byrne in the liner notes of Once in a Lifetime: The Best of Talking Heads. "At our deaths and at the apocalypse... (always looming, folks). I think it succeeded. The front bit, the white gospel choir, is kind of tacked on, 'cause I didn't think the rest of the song was enough... I mean, it was only two chords. So, out of embarrassment, or shame, I wrote an intro section that had a couple more in it."

Reception
Cash Box said that "this marching single which features David Byrne's soothing lead vocal is a curious and circus-ride look at life."  Billboard said that within the song "a cappella gospel leads into Louisiana hootenanny."

Music video
The video for the song was directed by Byrne and Stephen R. Johnson and features the band and various objects revolving, including boxes revolving around David Byrne's head, as well as a couple growing older, masked businessmen pummeling each other with briefcases and a runaway shopping cart, as if in their own "road to nowhere".

Some parts were shot in the back yard and pool of actor Stephen Tobolowsky, who was co-writing Byrne's film True Stories at the time. Director Johnson re-used some of the effects techniques in award-winning videos for Peter Gabriel the following year: "Sledgehammer" and "Big Time".

It was nominated for Best Video of the Year at the 1986 MTV Video Music Awards, losing out to "Money for Nothing" by Dire Straits.

Personnel
Talking Heads
David Byrne – lead vocals and backing vocals, electric guitar
Jerry Harrison – organ and backing vocals
Tina Weymouth – bass and backing vocals
Chris Frantz – drums

Additional musicians
Andrew Cader – washboard
Erin Dickens – backing vocals
Diva Gray – backing vocals
Gordon Grody – backing vocals
Lani Groves – backing vocals
Jimmy Macdonell – accordion 
Lenny Pickett – saxophone
Steve Scales – tambourine
Kurt Yaghjian – backing vocals

Cover versions and other uses

 Charlie Crist, in his unsuccessful 2010 run for the U.S. Senate in Florida, used the song in a campaign video without obtaining permission. David Byrne sued for copyright infringement and, in a legal settlement, Crist issued a video apology for his improper use.

References

1984 songs
1985 singles
Sire Records singles
Songs about death
Song recordings produced by David Byrne
Song recordings produced by Jerry Harrison
Songs written by Chris Frantz
Songs written by David Byrne
Songs written by Jerry Harrison
Songs written by Tina Weymouth
Talking Heads songs
Music videos directed by Stephen R. Johnson